The 2nd (West Africa) Infantry Brigade was a Second World War formation of the British Army. It was formed from battalions of the Royal West African Frontier Force in 1940. In the early part of the war, the Brigade served in the East African campaign before seeing action against the Japanese in Burma in 1944–45.

History
The brigade was originally formed as 4th (Gold Coast) Infantry Brigade but was re-designated 24th (Gold Coast) Infantry Brigade in October 1940. It was involved in the East African Campaign against the forces of the Italian Colonial Empire in Kenya under the command of Brigadier Collen Edward Melville Richards and was attached to the 2nd (African) Division. During the East African Campaign, the brigade was part of Andrew Cunningham's force which attacked from Kenya into Italian Somaliland and then advanced into Ethiopia. After the campaign, the brigade returned to West Africa in December 1941 and was reorganized as an independent brigade group (with attached engineer and artillery units). They were then designated as the 2nd (West African) Infantry Brigade.

In October 1942 command of the brigade passed to Brigadier Ernest Western who was to remain in this role until March 1945. In 1944, reorganized once more as an infantry brigade, the 2nd (West African) was attached to the 82nd (West Africa) Division and sailed for Ceylon, where the complete division was assembled on July 20. They then moved to Burma and took part in the third Arakan Campaign in December 1944 as part of Philip Christison's XV Corps.

It first advanced south along the Kalapanzin valley, then crossed a steep and jungle-covered mountain range to converge with the British 81st (West Africa) Division on Myohaung at the mouth of the Kaladan River. This move forced the Japanese to evacuate the Mayu peninsula which they had held for almost four years, and retreat south along the coast. They continued to advance maintaining pressure, on the Japanese capturing the port of Gwa shortly before the Japanese abandoned Burma. Western was wounded in March 1945 and command of the brigade was given to Brigadier Adam Wilson-Brand.

Formation 
The 2nd (West Africa) Infantry Brigade was made up of the following units:

1st Bn., The Gold Coast Regiment; 
2nd Bn., The Gold Coast Regiment;
3rd Bn., The Gold Coast Regiment.

Notes

References
 Allen, Louis. (1984). Burma: The Longest War 1941–45. Reprinted 2002. Phoenix Press. .
 Jackson, Ashley. (2006). The British Empire and the Second World War. Continuum International Publishing Group. .
 Moreman, T.R. (2005). The Jungle, the Japanese and the British Commonwealth Armies at War, 1941-45. Routledge. .

External links
 Burma Star.org

Infantry brigades of the British Army in World War II
Military units and formations in Burma in World War II
Military units and formations in British Somaliland in World War II
Military units and formations established in 1940
Military units and formations disestablished in 1945